Areca parens is a species of flowering plant in the family Arecaceae. It is found only on the island of Luzon in the Philippines. It is threatened by habitat loss and listed on the IUCN Red List as Vulnerable.

References

parens
Flora of Luzon
Endemic flora of the Philippines
Vulnerable flora of Asia
Plants described in 1919
Taxa named by Odoardo Beccari
Taxonomy articles created by Polbot